La Piedad is a municipality located at  in the north-west of the Mexican state of Michoacán, bordering Jalisco and Guanajuato. The municipal seat is the town of La Piedad de Cabadas.  The original colonial name was San Sebastián. It is bordered by the town of Santa Ana Pacueco, Guanajuato. Both towns straddle the Lerma River. La Piedad's population was 106,490 inhabitants in the 2020 census (250,000 including its metropolitan area). The municipality has an area of 284.11 km² (109.7 sq mi). It is bordered by the states of Jalisco and Guanajuato.

Limits
La Piedad, "north door" of the state of Michoacán, surrounding the Lerma river, has limits at the north with the municipalities of Degollado, Jalisco and Pénjamo, Guanajuato; at the east with the municipality of Numarán, Michoacán; at the south with the municipalities of Zináparo, Churintzio, and Ecuandureo, Michoacán; and at the west with the municipality of Yurécuaro.

The municipality is connected through roads and highways with cities in the Mexican states of Jalisco, Guanajuato, and of course, the rest of Michoacán.

Distances and average driving times:

 89 km from Irapuato, Guanajuato. (1 h)
 120 km from León, Guanajuato. (1 h 15 min)
 166 km from Morelia, Michoacán. (1 h 40 min)
 55 km from Zamora, Michoacán. (40 min)
 177.5 km from Guadalajara, Jalisco. (1 h 50 min)
 201.0 km from Querétaro. (2 h 00 min)
 40. km from Penjamillo. (42 min)

History
In the 12th century Aztecas moved away from Aztlan looking for a new land to settle. In this travel they founded several towns. Zula (meaning quails territory) was one of this towns established on the shore of the Lerma river.

In 1380, Tariácuri purepecha's king, conquered the town of Zula and named it Aramutaro, which means place with caves.

Almost two centuries later, Antonio de Villarroel serving Nuño de Guzmán took control of the town on the San Sebastian's day of 1530 (January 20), so renaming the town as "San Sebastián de Aramutarillo".

From 1530 to 1687, San Sebastian was in total oblivion, victim of slavery and ignorance; nevertheless there were two historic facts, which changed course for the town, one political affair and another religious matter.

The religious matter refers to a finding of a branch from a tree resembling Jesus Christ on the Cross. This happened the midnight of Christmas Eve on a place called Buena Huerta. The towns in its surrounding asked for the Jesus Christ image to be taken to their churches. San Sebastián de Aramutarillo was selected to keep the Christ image. After that, the Christ image was called "Señor de La Piedad" (Lord of Mercy) where Templo del Senor de La Piedad was built in its honor, which also has the biggest dome in the country.

The political affair was the movement of political offices from Tlazazalca to San Sebastian de Aramutarillo. This causes that many people came to offer merchandise, crafts, etc. In this way the town was officially founded in 1692, when Juan López de Aguirre named it as La Piedad.

Attractions
Places of interest include the town center with its kiosco (bandstand) built with quarried stone, the gateways, and the Señor de La Piedad church, which boasts perhaps the biggest dome in the country. Also of note are the Cabadas Bridge and the 30-metre-high El Salto waterfall. The local zoo and "La Torre de la Gaviota" located at the Ciudad del Sol neighborhood, are also places of interest in La Piedad.

There are also urban parks such as Morelos Park and La Placa park. The city is known because of its colorful Rebozos, and the singer José Alfredo Jiménez made it more famous with the song "El Perro Negro" ("The Black Dog").

Industry
La Piedad is a hub for agricultural products. The town was once known as the center of the Mexican pork industry, and still plays an important part in that industry. However, La Piedad has recently moved its economy towards textiles. Major textil manufacturers include Olmeca, Marval and Manriquez. Surrounding towns are Santa Ana, Yurecuaro, Degollado, Numaran, and Ecuandureo. La Piedad is also the headquarters for veterinary pharmaceuticals company LaPisa and industrial turbine manufacturer Turbomaquinas and Famaq. Also there is an important candy factory named Cabadas and sausage factories like Nu-tres, Delta and Bafar (former Parma). Most companies are family owned and operated. These are Saldaña and García, the latter owns Turbomaquinas S.A. de C.V., FAMAQ, Turboaleaciones S.A. de C.V. and the former owns Grupo Kasto.

There are 569 companies registered in the municipality, which puts La Piedad in the top four cities in the state with the greatest number of companies, after Morelia, Uruapan, and Zamora.

Ferromex Railway and Kansas City Southern de México crosses La Piedad allowing other companies to settle around in the future.

Education 
Currently the municipality has pre-school institutions, elementary, middle and high school, and the following 6 colleges:

 Colegio de Michoacán
 Instituto Tecnológico de La Piedad
 Universidad de León campus La Piedad
 Centro de estudios universitarios Veracruz (Univer) campus La Piedad
 Universidad del Valle de Atemajac campus La Piedad
 Instituto Michoacano de Ciencias de la Educación (IMCED)

Additionally there is a House of Culture, the cultural center piedadense and the Higher School of Music.

Media
TV channels - There are 2 local channels, Videa Plataforma TV and TV La Piedad (there is also a cable service)
Radio stations in FM and AM
Newspapers - La Redaccion, Info Metropoli.
Internet - Código Libre

Politics
 Mayors 
 1940–1941 PRI Ezequiel Martínez Aguilar
 1942 PRI Dr. Rafael Aceves Alvarado
 1943 PRI Roberto Chavolla Bernúdez
 1944 PRI Miguel Camarena Pérez
 1944–1945 PRI Antonio Licea Luna
 1946 PRI Manuel Rodríguez Guillen
 1946 PRI Angel Pichardo
 1947 PRI José Arroyo Domínguez
 1948 PRI J. Reyes Rojas
 1949–1950 PRI José Villegas Hernández
 1951 PRI Luis Trillo Meza
 1952 PRI Carlos Avila Escoto
 1953 PRI Luis Trillo Meza
 1954 PRI Carlos López Gallegos
 1955 PRI Ing. José García Castillo
 1956 PRI Agustín Belmonte Belmonte
 1957–1958 PRI Lic. Pedro Elorza Aguilar
 1959 PRI Ricardo Guerrero Celedón
 1960–1961 PRI Benjamín Torres Rojas
 1962 PRI José Villegas Hernández
 1963–1964 PRI Dr. Javier García Castillo
 1965 PRI Agustín Belmonte Munguía
 1966–1968 PRI José Luis Fernández Alba
 1969–1971 PRI Lic. Rodolfo Ramírez Trillo
 1972–1974 PRI Dr. Marco Antonio Aviña
 1975–1976 PRI Arq. Pablo Aguilera Navarro
 1977 PRI C.P. Julián Morales
 1978–1980 PRI Lic. José Vicente Aguilar Rizo
 1981–1983 PRI Guillermo Alvarado Magdaleno
 1984–1986 PRI Guillermo Rizo Hernández
 1986 PRI Profr. Rogelio Baltierra Flores
 1987–1989 PRI José Luis Fernández Alba
 1990–1991 PRI Eduardo Villaseñor Peña
 1991–1992 PRI C.P. Alipio Bribiesca Tafolla
 1993–1995 PRI Ing. José Adolfo Mena Rojas
 1996–1998 PAN Ing. Raúl García Castillo
 1999–2001 PRI Ramón Maya Morales
 2002–2004 PRI Lic. Jaime Mares Camarena
 2005–2007 PAN Arturo Torres Santos
 2008–2011 PAN Ricardo Guzman Romero †
 2011 PAN José Padilla Alfaro
 2012–2015 PAN Hugo Anaya Ávila
 2015–2018 PRI Ing. Juan Manuel Estrada Medina
 2018–2021 PAN-PRD Alejandro Espinoza Ávila

Notable citizens
Athletes and celebrities who were born or lived in La Piedad include Ramon Morales, retired midfielder for C.D. Guadalajara football team as well as his brother Carlos Morales, midfielder for Santos. The frontman for Regional Mexican group "Los Razos de Sacramento y Reynaldo" Sacramento Ramirez is also from La Piedad. Jimmy Gazcon, musician and singer living in northern California and born in the neighborhood (colonia/barrio) of Perros Bravos started with Grupo Los Juniors 1977- and one year later was a keyboardist of Grupo Zula founded with Ramon Hernandez Plodo (aka) "El Pato". Jimmy also was keyboardist of Grupo Parlamento in 1982.

 Arts / Shows 
Salvador Meza Mendez-Painter, known for his oil and pencil paintings about city's historical monuments
 Francisco Núñez Montes - músico
Jimmy Gazcon (musician / singer /showman
  Marco Islas  - Cantante de musica vernacula
 Ignacio Ortiz - Painter
 Vicente de P. Cano - Poet
 Josefina Baez- Poet
 José Gómez Rogil - Poet
 Carlos Alvarado Lang - Engraver
 Juan Rodríguez Vega - Musician
 Manuel Ayala Tejeda - Poet, writer, City's historian. (1913–1997)
 Heriberto Guízar Castro - Radio founder in La Piedad. (1918–2000)
 José García del Río - General's cousin Lázaro Cárdenas del Río drilled wells and provided the city with water.
 Lic. Rafael Reyes - Lawyer, he was always worried about education.
 Luis G. Ayala - Playwright, theater director, and teacher.
 Malena Padilla Alfaro - Children theater director, pastorelas, and traditional Christ Nativity wax representation artist, inherited from her mother's creations Mrs. Lupita Alfaro de Padilla.
 Rafael Padilla Alfaro - Teacher, decorator, and The Sagrada Imágen de Nuestro Señor de la Piedad fervous servant.

 Politics 
 Jose Garcia del Río.- Economist, Industrialist, Capitalist, and Municipal President - Cousin to national president, Lazaro Cardenas
 Mariano Silva y Aceves.- Pedagogue, UNAM's first dean
 Jesús Romero Flores - Part of the group of people that formed the Mexican Constitution.
 Eduardo Villaseñor Peña - Michoacán's Governor (1992).
 María Guadalupe Sánchez Martínez - Federal Delegate, Secretary of Government, Michoacán State.
 Pedro Aceves Parra - Revolutionary
 Octavio Solis Ramirez - Politician - Mexico City
 Arnulfo Ávila Ávila - Politician
 Humberto Romero Pérez - Politician
 Guillermo Rizo Hernández - Politician and administrator

 Sports 
 Yovani Gallardo - Baseball player - Milwaukee Brewers
 Patricia Mariscal - Won medals in Tae kwon do world championships
 Hector Pulido - Soccer player, he was part of the national team and coach of Cruz Azul Club (finalist in season 1986–1987)
 Gustavo Vargas - Soccer player
 Ramón Morales - Soccer player, he has been part of the national team and played in the World Cup 2002 in Korea-Japan
 Carlos Morales - Soccer player, he has been part of the national team
 Fernando Lopez - Soccer player
 Jorge Flores - Basketball Player - 1976 Summer Olympics for National Team

 Religion 
 Juan Espinoza Jiménez - Works in Vatican with the Pope
 Carlos Suárez Cazares - Bishop
 Omar Sebastián Ayala Méndez - Evangelist of Christian Fundamentalism (Protestantism, Reformed Church)

Sports
In the city there are basketball and soccer (male and female) leagues, there are wrestling exhibitions, and the city has been the finish of the Ruta Mexico (cycling). There are two public sport centers, clubs with tennis courts, a lienzo charro, and the Juan N. Lopez stadium, and several taekwondo schools from different institutions.

Outside the city are the Alianza, Mercantil and Azteca clubs, where there are football fields and swimming pools.

La Piedad had a football team in Mexico's First Division in 1952-53 season, and again in 2001 Winter and 2002 Summer seasons.

Previously, C.F. La Piedad played in Ascenso MX.

Traffic
La Piedad is located close to the border of three states, Michoacán, Guanajuato and Jalisco. There are three highways entering this city: Mexico highways 110, 39, and 90.

Highway 110 goes west and takes you to the towns of Yurécuaro, Tanhuato, Vista Hermosa, Briseñas y La Barca, and the free-toll route to Guadalajara. Highway 37 runs south of La Piedad to Zamora, this highway goes to the toll highway 15, which goes north-south, from Nogales to Mexico City. Highway 90 runs north of La Piedad to the town of Degollado and states of Guanajuato and Jalisco.

Sister cities
La Piedad has one sister cities, as designated by Sister Cities International: 
  Woodland, California, USA

References

 Link to tables of population data from Census of 2005 INEGI: Instituto Nacional de Estadística, Geografía e Informática
 Michoacán Enciclopedia de los Municipios de México

External links
 La Piedad
 Ayuntamiento de La Piedad Official website
 Another official web site
 Videa Television

Populated places in Michoacán